MØ is a Danish singer songwriter (real name Karen Marie Ørsted).

Mø or ungmø (Danish for "maid") may also refer to:

MΦ (not to be confused with MØ), an abbreviation for Macrophages, cells produced by the differentiation of monocytes in tissues

See also
Mo (disambiguation)